Francesco Maria Macchiavelli  (1608 – 22 November 1653) was an Italian Catholic cardinal. Born in Florence, he was bishop of Ferrara from 1638 to 1653.

He was made a cardinal on the 16 December 1641 by Pope Urban VIII, was the nephew of cardinal Lorenzo Magalotti and the cousin of cardinals Francesco Barberini the elder and Antonio Barberini the younger.

He died at Ferrara in 1653.

References

1608 births
1653 deaths
Clergy from Florence
17th-century Italian cardinals
Cardinals created by Pope Urban VIII
Bishops of Ferrara
17th-century Italian Roman Catholic bishops
Latin Patriarchs of Constantinople